Goes West is the fourth studio album by American singer-songwriter William Tyler. It was released on January 25, 2019 through Merge Records.

The cover art for Goes West was designed by Robert Beatty.

Track listing

Charts

References

2019 albums
William Tyler (musician) albums
Merge Records albums
Albums with cover art by Robert Beatty (artist)